Paris Orly Airport, commonly referred to as Orly , is one of two international airports serving the French capital, Paris, the other one being Charles de Gaulle Airport (CDG). It serves as a secondary hub for domestic and overseas territories flights of Air France and as the homebase for Transavia France. Flights operate to destinations in Europe, the Middle East, Africa, the Caribbean and North America.

Before the opening of Charles de Gaulle Airport in 1974, Orly was the main airport of Paris. Even with the shift of most international traffic to Charles de Gaulle Airport, Orly remains the busiest French airport for domestic traffic and the second busiest French airport overall in passenger traffic, with 33,120,685 passengers in 2018. The airport is operated by Groupe ADP under the brand Paris Aéroport. Since Octobre 2020, the CEO of the airport has been Justine Coutard.

Location
The airport area, including terminals and runways, spans over two départements and seven communes:
 Essonne département: communes of Paray-Vieille-Poste (West Terminal and half of South Terminal), Wissous, Athis-Mons, Chilly-Mazarin, and Morangis;
 Val-de-Marne département: communes of Villeneuve-le-Roi and Orly (half of South Terminal).

Management of the airport, however, is solely under the authority of Aéroports de Paris, which also manages Charles de Gaulle Airport, Le Bourget Airport, and several smaller airports in the suburbs of Paris.

History

First years
Originally known as Villeneuve-Orly Airport, the facility was opened in the southern suburbs of Paris in 1932 as a secondary airport to Le Bourget. Before this two huge airship hangars had been built there by the engineer Eugène Freyssinet from 1923 on.

World War II
As a result of the Battle of France in 1940, Orly Airport was used by the occupying German Luftwaffe as a combat airfield, stationing various fighter and bomber units at the airport throughout the occupation. Consequently, Orly was repeatedly attacked by the Royal Air Force and United States Army Air Forces (USAAF), destroying much of its infrastructure, and leaving its runways with numerous bomb craters to limit its usefulness to the Germans.

After the Battle of Normandy and the retreat of German forces from the Paris area in August 1944, Orly was partially repaired by USAAF combat engineers and was used by Ninth Air Force as tactical airfield A-47. The 50th Fighter Group flew P-47 Thunderbolt fighter-bomber aircraft from the airport until September, then liaison squadrons used the airfield until October 1945.

Post-war
The USAAF diagram from March 1947 shows the  27/207 (degrees magnetic) runway (later 03R) with  81/261 runway (later 08L) crossing it at its north end.

The American United States Army Air Forces 1408th Army Air Force Base Unit was the primary operator at Orly Field until March 1947 when control was returned to the French Government. (The United States Air Force leased a small portion of the Airport to support Supreme Headquarters Allied Powers Europe (SHAPE) at Rocquencourt). The Americans left in 1967 as a result of France's withdrawal from NATO's integrated military command, and all non-French NATO forces were asked to leave France.

In May 1958, Pan Am Douglas DC-7Cs flew to Los Angeles in 21 hr 56 min; TWA, Air France and Pan Am flew nonstop to New York in 14 hrs 10–15 min. Air France flew to Tokyo in 31 hr 5 min via Anchorage or 44 hr 45 min on a seven-stop Lockheed Constellation (1049G model) via India. Air France's ten flights a day to London were almost all Vickers Viscounts; the only other London flight was Alitalia's daily Douglas DC-6B (BEA was at Le Bourget).

A development project voted in 2012 planned to merge the airport's south and west terminals with the construction of an  building to create one great terminal. On 14 April 2016, the Groupe ADP rolled out the Connect 2020 corporate strategy and the commercial brand Paris Aéroport was applied to all Parisian airports, including the Orly airport.

On November 7, 2015, the failure of a two-decade-old Windows 3.1 system which was responsible for communicating visual range information in foggy weather to pilots caused a temporary cease of operations. Whether the failure was hardware- or software-based is not specified, though the highlighting of the operating system suggests a software failure.

As part of the COVID-19 pandemic and its impact on aviation, the airport was closed to all commercial traffic from 1 April 2020 to 25 June 2020. During this period, commercial traffic and flights were relocated to Charles de Gaulle Airport, while Orly was still used for State flights, emergency diversions, and medical evacuations.

Terminals

Terminals 1 and 2
Known as the West Terminal until March 2019, these two terminals consist of two floors and a gate area of four "fingers" rather than a brick-style layout. The ground level 0 features the arrivals facilities including eight baggage reclaim belts as well as several service facilities and shops. The departures area is located on level 1 with more stores and restaurants located here. This central departures area is connected to three gate areas split between Orly 1 (A and B gates) and Orly 2 (C gates). 23 stands at this terminal are equipped with jet-bridges, with several of them also able to handle wide-body aircraft.

Terminal 3
Inaugurated in April 2019, Terminal 3 is a junction building between Terminals 1, 2 and 4. The terminal allows customers to travel between all areas of the airport under one roof. It includes around 5,000 sqm of Duty Free shopping along with several restaurants and lounges. It houses gates D and E, with direct access to Orly 4 departure gates.

Terminal 4
Formerly known as the South Terminal this innovative 1961 steel-and-glass terminal building consists of six floors. While the smaller basement level −1 as well as the upper levels 2, 3 and 4 contain only some service facilities, restaurants and office space, level 0 features the arrivals facilities as well as several shops and service counters. The airside area and departure gates are located on the upper level 1. The waiting area, which features several shops as well, houses gates E and F. 15 of the terminal's departure gates are equipped with jet-bridges, some of them are able to handle wide-body aircraft.

Airlines and destinations
The following airlines operate regular scheduled and charter flights at Paris-Orly Airport:

Statistics

Other facilities
AOM French Airlines had its head office in Orly Airport Building 363 in Paray-Vieille-Poste. After AOM and Air Liberté merged in 2001, the new airline, Air Lib, occupied building 363.

Ground transportation

Train
Orly Airport is directly served by two train lines, which offer connections to the larger Paris transportation network:

 Tramway T7 connects to Terminal 4, and offers service to Villejuif–Louis Aragon station on Paris Métro Line 7.
 Orlyval people mover line that connects two stations at Orly terminals (Orly 1, 2, 3 station and Orly 4 station) with Antony station, served by the RER B line. Passengers can also transfer to Tramway T7 at Orly 4 station. Orlyval is free to use between the two stations at Orly; however a premium fare is charged between Antony and Orly Airport (the suburb of Antony is about 5 km from the airport).

Two additional Paris Métro services are expected to be extended to Orly in the near future: Line 14 is expected to open in 2024, and Line 18 is due to enter service in 2026.

Car
Orly Airport is connected to the A106 autoroute (spur of the A6 autoroute).

Buses and coaches
 OrlyBus direct to Denfert-Rochereau station
 Disneyland Magical Shuttle direct to Disneyland Paris
 RATP bus 183 to Rungis International Market via Pont de Rungis–Aéroport d'Orly station (connection to RER C) and Robert Peary station (connection to Tramway T9)
 Albatrans bus 91-10 to Saint-Quentin-en-Yvelines–Montigny-le-Bretonneux station (connection to Transilien) via Massy-Palaiseau station (connection to TGV)
 Noctilien night buses:
 N22 to Paris (Châtelet–Les Halles station)
 N31 to Paris (Gare de Lyon) 
 N131 to Paris (Gare de Lyon) via Brétigny station
 N144 to Paris (Gare de l'Est) via Corbeil-Essonnes

Accidents and incidents
On 10 February 1948, SNCASE Languedoc P/7 F-BATH of Air France was damaged beyond economical repair at Orly Airport.
On 20 September 1952, a USAF Douglas C-47 Skytrain on final approach to ORY struck a telephone pole, rooftops and crashed and caught fire 1 km (0.6 mi) from ORY. Three of the four occupants on board died.
On 27 November 1953, a USAF Fairchild C-119 Flying Boxcar crashed 4 km (2.5 mi) NE of ORY on approach, crashing in flames in the Cholsy-le-Roy neighborhood of Paris. The cause was the rear clam shell doors broke off striking the horizontal stabilizer, causing a catastrophic failure of the empennage. All six occupants were killed.
On 24 November 1956, Alitalia - Linee Aerre Italiane S.p.A. Flight 451, a Douglas DC-6 crashed 0.6 km (0.4 mi) W of ORY moments after takeoff, some 10–15 seconds later altitude was lost and the DC-6 struck a house 600 m past the runway end. All 10 crew and 34 of the 35 passengers were killed. Cause unknown.
On 21 January 1957, a SNCASE Armagnac crashed attempting to land at night with instrument landing system monitored by GCA. One crewmember and one passenger out of the 70 on board died.
 On 3 June 1962, Air France Flight 007, a chartered Boeing 707 named the Chateau de Sully bound for Atlanta, US, crashed on take-off with 132 people on board; 130 of them were killed. The only survivors were two stewardesses seated in the rear of the plane. The charter flight was carrying home Atlanta's civic and cultural leaders of the day. At the time, this was the highest recorded death toll for an incident involving a single aircraft.
 On 11 July 1973, Varig Flight 820, a Boeing 707, made a forced landing due to fire in a rear lavatory, incoming from Rio de Janeiro–Galeão. The aircraft landed 5 kilometers short of the runway, in a full-flap and gear down configuration. Due mainly to smoke inhalation, there were 123 deaths whilst 11 people survived (10 crew, one passenger).
 On 3 March 1974, Turkish Airlines Flight 981, in an event known as the "Ermenonville air disaster", crashed in Ermenonville forest after take-off from Orly on a flight to London's Heathrow Airport when an improperly closed cargo door burst open. The explosive decompression that resulted brought down the McDonnell Douglas DC-10. All 346 people on board were killed, making the accident one of the deadliest in aviation history.

Non-aircraft related
 On 13 and 19 January 1975, a series of RPG attacks by Popular Front for the Liberation of Palestine caused collateral damage and injured 23.
 On 20 May 1978, three terrorists armed with submachine guns opened fire at the El Al boarding gate, killing 5 and injuring 5.
 On 15 July 1983, a bombing of a Turkish Airlines check-in counter by ASALA killed 8 people and injured 55.
 On 18 March 2017, a man attempted to grab the gun of a soldier who was patrolling the airport as part of Opération Sentinelle. The attacker was shot and killed.

See also
 Groupe ADP
 Paris Aéroport
 United States Air Force in France
 List of the busiest airports in France

References

Sources
 McAuliffe, Jerome J.: U.S. Air Force in France 1950–1967 (2005), Chapter 14, "Paris-USAF Operations".

External links

 Orly Airport aviation weather 

1909 establishments in France
Airports established in 1909
Orly
Airport Orly
Buildings and structures in Val-de-Marne